The Lincoln Square Synagogue is a Modern Orthodox synagogue located at 180 Amsterdam Avenue between West 68th and 69th Streets in the Lincoln Square neighborhood of Manhattan, New York City.  Founded in 1964, the physical location of the congregation has changed several times. The most recent move took place in January 2013. The new building is the largest synagogue to be built in New York City in over 50 years. The current senior Rabbi is Rabbi Shaul Robinson.

History
The Lincoln Square Synagogue was founded as a congregation in 1964 by Rabbi Shlomo Riskin. In the late 1960s, the first Orthodox Jewish women's tefillah (prayer) group was created, on the holiday of Simhat Torah at Lincoln Square Synagogue.

The travertine building it formerly occupied at 200 Amsterdam Avenue, just 250 feet from its current building, was built in 1970, and was designed by the firm of Hausman & Rosenberg.  Because it had outgrown that building, the synagogue moved to a new building designed by Cetra/Ruddy in mid-January 2013, after a development process that lasted seven years. The move was the result of a land swap between the synagogue and the development company American Continental Properties, in which the congregation received $20 million to aid in paying for the construction of the new building.  Despite this, and the $10 million raised by the congregation, construction was held up in 2010 because of a lack of funds, which was made up by a single contribution of $20 million from an anonymous donor.  The old building is being replaced by a luxury apartment tower called 200 Amsterdam.

The new building, the largest new synagogue in New York City in 50 years, is five stories tall and comprises , including a sanctuary able to hold 429 people. The horseshoe shape of the seating in the sanctuary of the old building was kept, but with changes that help to focus one's attention on the ark.

The building won Architectural Lightings 2015 award for interior lighting.

Clergy

Rabbi Shaul Robinson

Rabbi Shaul Robinson is currently the senior rabbi at Lincoln Square Synagogue. Robinson has held the position since September 1, 2005. He is credited with setting up and directing the first ever "Department for Professional Rabbinic Development" in the United Kingdom.

Cantor Sherwood Goffin

Cantor Sherwood Goffin served the synagogue since its founding in 1965. He retired in 2015, only acting as Cantor occasionally on Shabbat. Cantor Goffin has been only Principal of the Lincoln Square Synagogue Feldman Hebrew School since 1965. He obtained "Cantor for Life" tenure in 1986. Cantor Goffin worked with Cantor Yaakov Lemmer. Goffin died on April 2, 2019.

Notable people
Kenneth Brander – assistant rabbi and then acting rabbi from 1990–91, later president and Rosh HaYeshiva of the Ohr Torah Stone network of institutions
Shlomo Einhorn – Orthodox rabbi and later Dean of School at Yeshivat Yavneh (Yavneh Hebrew Academy) in Los Angeles, interned at LSS
Elena Kagan – Supreme Court justice had her bat mitzvah at the synagogue.
David Remnick – Pulitzer Prize-winning journalist and author

ReferencesNotes'

External links

Official website

Modern Orthodox synagogues in the United States
Jewish organizations established in 1964
Synagogues in Manhattan
Round and octagonal synagogues
Orthodox synagogues in New York City
Lincoln Square, Manhattan
1964 establishments in New York City